Myronivka Raion was a raion (district) in Kyiv Oblast of Ukraine. Its administrative center was the city of Myronivka. The raion was abolished on 19 July 2020 as part of the administrative reform of Ukraine, which reduced the number of raions of Kyiv Oblast to seven. The area of Myronivka Raion was merged into Obukhiv Raion.

At the time of disestablishment, the raion consisted of one hromada, Myronivka urban hromada  with the administration in Myronivka.

References

Former raions of Kyiv Oblast
1965 establishments in Ukraine
Ukrainian raions abolished during the 2020 administrative reform